Elna Reinach and Patrick Galbraith were the defending champions but lost in the first round to Mary Pierce and Luke Jensen.

Meredith McGrath and Matt Lucena won in the final 6–4, 6–4 against Gigi Fernández and Cyril Suk.

Seeds
Champion seeds are indicated in bold text while text in italics indicates the round in which those seeds were eliminated.

Draw

Final

Top half

Bottom half

References
1995 US Open – Doubles draws and results at the International Tennis Federation

Mixed Doubles
US Open (tennis) by year – Mixed doubles